Great Alamance Creek, also called Big Alamance Creek, is a 37-mile long creek that is a tributary of the Haw River.  The creek's headwaters are in Guilford County, but it flows primarily through Alamance County, North Carolina.  It is a major source of water for the cities of Burlington and Greensboro through the Lake Mackintosh Reservoir.  It was called "Alamance" after an old local Native American word used to describe the blue-colored mud in the bottom of the creek.

The creek was a part of the site of the Battle of Alamance, fought in 1771 between the colonial militia under the command of Governor William Tryon.  When Alamance County was formed from Orange County in 1849, it was named for this battle and creek.

Great Alamance Creek has a tributary that is also called "Alamance Creek" - Little Alamance Creek, which is actually a little longer than Great Alamance Creek at over 12 miles, much of it in Burlington.  However, it has less water flow than Great Alamance Creek.  Little Alamance Creek flows through City Park in Burlington.

Variant names
According to the Geographic Names Information System, it has also been known historically as: 
Alamance Creek
Aramanchy River  (In the 1751 Fry-Jefferson map, the "m" is obscured at the fold.)
Aramancy River
Big Alamance Creek

See also
List of rivers of North Carolina

References

Rivers of North Carolina
Rivers of Guilford County, North Carolina
Rivers of Alamance County, North Carolina